Esfarvarin District is a district (bakhsh) in Takestan County, Qazvin Province, Iran. At the 2006 census, its population was 28,845, in 6,583 families.  The District has one city: Esfarvarin.  The District has two rural districts (dehestan): Ak Rural District and Khorramabad Rural District.

References 

Districts of Qazvin Province
Takestan County